Martha Merrow (born 1957) is an American chronobiologist. She currently chairs the Institute of Medical Psychology at the Ludwig Maximilian University of Munich. Her career focuses primarily on investigating the molecular and genetic mechanisms of the circadian clock. Since joining the Ludwig Maximilian University in 1996, Merrow has investigated molecular and genetic mechanisms of the circadian clock as well as daily human behavior and medical psychology.

Life
Merrow was born in 1957 in Bloomfield, Connecticut and currently resides in Munich, Germany with her two daughters.

Education
Merrow received her bachelor's degree in Biology at Middlebury College in 1979. After working in a pediatric nephrology laboratory under Dr. Thomas Kennedy for five years, Merrow headed to Tufts University School of Medicine and earned her Ph.D. in Immunology in 1991. Later that year, she pursued her Post-Doctoral Fellowship in Chronobiology at Dartmouth Medical School, which she completed in 1996.

Career

Research
Merrow is well known for her work on the entrainment of circadian clocks in both humans and the fungus Neurospora crassa. She has also worked to describe circadian clocks in mutant or model genetic organisms lacking clear circadian phenotypes. Merrow worked with colleagues Till Roenneberg and Anna Wirz-Justice to develop the Munich ChronoType Questionnaire ((MCTQ)), which assesses human chronotypes. Those with early chronotypes may be referred to as “larks” while those with late chronotypes may be referred to as “owls.”

Merrow’s molecular chronobiology lab at Ludwig Maximilian University of Munich uses nematodes, yeast, fungi, and human tissue cultures to study the circadian clock in simple systems. Her research focuses on oscillations at the cellular and molecular levels as a representation of organismal rhythms. Merrow’s lab often uses techniques such as the insertion of Luciferase gene fusions or Green Fluroescent Protein to visualize oscillations of RNA levels, protein abundance, or protein modifications within the cell. Oscillations in the entrained phase can then be compared to the organism’s free running period or the phase produced by other methods of entrainment to elucidate the mechanism of the clock.

Professional achievements 
While she was a professor of Chronobiology at University of Groningen, Merrow led Sub-Project 4: Novel Clock Genes and Principles within EUCLOCK, a European organization of researchers interested in entrainment of circadian clocks. Merrow has served as the secretary and a member for the SRBR and is  currently the vice-president of the European Biological Rhythms Society (EBRS). Merrow coordinated the OnTime consortium, a group consisting of Netherlands-based researchers in the field of chronobiology and is a member of the Program Committee for the upcoming XV EBRS Congress event to be held in Amsterdam. The group attempts to improve health through an understanding of circadian clocks and their entrainment. This consortium has its roots in Merrow’s organization of the Dutch Clock Club, which is based on the structure of the UK Clock Club. She remains active in academia and has taught at the European Summer School for Chronobiology nearly every year since and including 1996. Additionally, Merrow strives to develop networks for women in science.

Timeline of achievements
2004: Received Aschoff's Rule prize from EBRS (European Biological Rhythms Society)
2004: Rosalind Franklin Research Fellowship at University of Groningen 
2006: Became Full Professor of Molecular and Genetic Chronobiology at University of Groningen
2006: VICI Award 
2011: Awarded OnTime Grant 
2012: Became Chair of Institute for Medical Psychology at Ludwig Maximilian University of Munich 
2014: Produced a Coursera on Chronobiology

Selected publications 
Some of Merrow's publications include:

References

External links 
 https://www.youtube.com/watch?v=nzUds0TIQMY Merrow's TED Talk on circadian clocks

1957 births
Living people
21st-century American biologists
Chronobiologists
Middlebury College alumni
Tufts University School of Medicine alumni